Ochyrotica moheliensis is a moth of the family Pterophoridae. It is known from the Comoros.

References

Ochyroticinae
Moths of the Comoros
Moths described in 1994
Endemic fauna of the Comoros